Stende is a town in Latvia.

Stende may also refer to:
Stende Manor, Latvia
Stende River, Latvia
Stende Station, Altvia
Stende, Soviet built freezer trawler later known as Dalniy Vostok, see Sinking of the Dalniy Vostok